Vanilla aphylla is a species of vanilla orchid. It is native to Southeast Asia. It is found throughout Southeast Asia including; Laos, Thailand, Malaysia and Singapore. Like all members of the genus Vanilla, V. aphyllum is a vine. It uses its fleshy roots to support itself as it grows.

References

External links 

aphylla
Orchids of Laos
Orchids of Malaysia
Orchids of Singapore
Orchids of Thailand
Flora of tropical Asia